Matt Thompson is an American television producer, television writer, television director, and voice actor.

Career

Early work 
Matt Thompson, and his creative partner Adam Reed, started out at Cartoon Network doing various odd jobs until they came up with their own show, High Noon Toons, in the mid-1990s. High Noon Toons was a 3-hour programming block of cartoons hosted by cowboy hand puppets Haas and Lil' Jo (a Bonanza pun). While working on this show, Matt and Adam were usually drunk and the two eventually got reprimanded for lighting one of the prop sets on fire.

He has also voiced the character of "Talent Scout" on the series 12 oz. Mouse.

Production companies 
Thompson and Reed formed 70/30 Productions when they started work on Sealab 2021. The company's name came from the plan that Thompson would do 70% of the producing and 30% of the writing, with Reed doing the reverse.

The pair became renowned for their work on a number of Adult Swim television projects, chiefly Sealab 2021 and their follow-up Frisky Dingo, which aired for several years.

In 2009, Reed and Thompson closed 70/30 Productions and formed Floyd County Productions to produce Reed's new project, the FX Network series Archer.

Archer has received positive reviews from critics and won many awards, including three Primetime Emmy Awards and four Critics Choice Awards. The series has also received 15 Annie Award nominations, among others, for outstanding achievement in animation, writing, direction, and voice acting. At San Diego Comic Con 2018, it was announced the tenth season would be titled Archer: 1999. Reed intended to leave Archer after its tenth season, although plans for the show were not finalized.

Since their founding of Floyd County Productions, the pair have grown the company from a small eight-person studio into one of the most competitive and sought after animation houses in the industry. The company not only develops exclusive programming but also produces content for other media, including the TV shows Atlanta, Legion, Fargo, Goliath, and It's Always Sunny in Philadelphia.

Filmography

Television
Producer

Executive producer

Director

Writer

Voice acting

Film

Accolades

References

External links 
 
 https://www.floydcountyproductions.tv/

Year of birth missing (living people)
Living people
American animators
American animated film directors
American animated film producers
American male voice actors
Place of birth missing (living people)